The Word was a monthly music magazine published in London. It was voted UK 'Music Magazine Of The Year' in 2007 and 2008. It ran for 114 issues, the last bearing the cover date August 2012.

History
The Word was launched in February 2003. It was the first magazine to come from Development Hell Ltd, an independent publishing venture set up by David Hepworth and Jerry Perkins, two former EMAP executives with more than 35 years combined experience devising, editing and publishing titles such as Q, Empire, Mojo and Heat. The company also produce the dance music and clubbing title Mixmag and owns the dance music networking site Don't Stay In. The Guardian Media Group owned 29.5% of the Development Hell Ltd. The Word was edited by Mark Ellen, former editor of Smash Hits, Q and Select, launch managing editor of Mojo, and former editor-in-chief of EMAP Metro.

On 29 June 2012, David Hepworth announced the closure of the magazine via his Twitter feed and on the magazine's website.

Content
The magazine was divided into two sections; the front, which featured photographs, interviews and features, and the rear, which concentrated on reviews of CDs, DVDs, books and films.

Regular features included 'Diary' (Mark Ellen discussing recent events) 'Face Time' (an interview feature), 'Word of Mouth' (People we like & the things they like) 'Departure Lounge' (obituaries), 'Word to the Wise' (an interview) 'InBox' (letters to the editor), and 'The Last Word', the reviews section. Latterly, this included 'The Massive Attacks', a section devoted to reader reviews taken from the magazine's website.

Artists interviewed by The Word included Paul McCartney, Prince, Nick Cave, Samuel L. Jackson, U2, Martin Scorsese, Thom Yorke, Morrissey, Björk, Michael Palin, Brian Eno, Peter Ackroyd, David Sedaris, Ricky Gervais, Russell Brand, Wim Wenders, Brian De Palma, Oasis, David Bowie, Joni Mitchell, Amy Winehouse, Leonard Cohen, Tom Waits, Leonardo DiCaprio, Kate Winslet, Sam Mendes, Salman Rushdie, Malcolm Gladwell, David Simon, Van Morrison, Robert Smith and Lou Reed.

Podcast 
The Word'''s weekly podcast was an informal, unscripted broadcast of irregular length, and featured regular contributors Mark Ellen, David Hepworth, Andrew Harrison, Fraser Lewry and Kate Mossman. Guests included Nick Lowe, Andrew Collins, Barry McIlheney, Clare Grogan, Supergrass, Danny Baker, CW Stoneking, Neil Hannon, Robin Ince, Devon Sproule & Paul Curreri, Dom Joly, Wilko Johnson, Van Dyke Parks, Bob Harris, Pugwash, Robert Forster, Jac Holzman, Darrell Scott and Chris Difford. One popular section was the telling of the HORA (Hoary Old Rock Anecdote). It ran for 217 episodes between October 2006 and June 2012.

In 2008 the magazine launched a second, occasional Podcast entitled 'Backstage'. It featured interviews with figures of interest including Richard Thompson, David Simon, Malcolm Gladwell, Neal Stephenson, Clive James and Pete Atkin, Don Felder, and Al Kooper.

In 2014 the podcast returned to iTunes with a series of interviews in front of a live audience at "The Islington" venue in North London. Guests included, Simon Napier Bell , Ben Watt and Danny Baker .

 Website The Word'''s website was a promotional tool for the magazine and a forum for its readers, although editorial staff occasionally posted and readers' reviews were reproduced in the magazine itself.

Following the closure of the Word Magazine website on 17 July 2012, the reader community created its own site, named The Afterword. with the aim of providing continuity of conversation and cultural discussion (and lists). The byline of the new site is: "Musings on The Byways Of Popular Culture".

List of cover stars

March 2003: Nick Cave
April 2003: Elvis Costello
May 2003: Blur
June 2003: Morrissey
July 2003: Björk
August 2003: Paul Weller
September 2003: Dido
October 2003: Travis
November 2003: David Bowie
December 2003: Paul McCartney
January 2004: Muddy Waters
February 2004: Elvis Presley
March 2004: The Secret History of Entertainment
April 2004: The iPod
May 2004: Franz Ferdinand
June 2004: How Rock Changed the Movies
July 2004: Jeff Buckley
August 2004: Prince
September 2004: The White Stripes
October 2004: Bruce Springsteen
November 2004: Live Aid
December 2004: John Peel
January 2005: Morrissey
February 2005: Tom Waits
March 2005: Joni Mitchell
April 2005: Eric Clapton
May 2005: Pete Doherty
June 2005: Bruce Springsteen
July 2005: Ry Cooder
August 2005: Paul Weller
September 2005: Noel Gallagher
October 2005: Roger Waters
November 2005: Mick Jones
December 2005: The Edge
January 2006: Bob Dylan
February 2006: Johnny Cash
March 2006: KT Tunstall
April 2006: Pet Shop Boys
May 2006: Jack Johnson
June 2006: Leonard Cohen
July 2006: Neil Young
August 2006: Keith Richards
September 2006: The 1980s
October 2006: Joe Strummer
November 2006: The Killers
December 2006: Tom Waits
January 2007: The Best of 2006
February 2007: Jim Morrison
March 2007: Amy Winehouse
April 2007: Joni Mitchell
May 2007: Rufus Wainwright
June 2007: Nick Cave
July 2007: Leonard Cohen
August 2007: Van Morrison
September 2007: Johnny Marr
October 2007: David Gilmour
November 2007: Bruce Springsteen
December 2007: Robert Plant
January 2008: The Best of 2007
February 2008: Morrissey
March 2008: Nick Cave
April 2008: Elvis Costello
May 2008: Roger Waters
June 2008: Thom Yorke
July 2008: John Martyn
August 2008: George Harrison
September 2008: Lemmy
October 2008: John Lennon
November 2008: Guy Garvey
December 2008: Jarvis Cocker
January 2009: Leonard Cohen
February 2009: Kate Bush
March 2009: John Martyn
April 2009: The Pet Shop Boys
May 2009: 50 Years Of Island Records
June 2009: Iggy Pop
July 2009: Bono
August 2009: The Beatles
September 2009: Robert Wyatt
October 2009: David Bowie
November 2009: Wayne Coyne
December 2009: The Specials
January 2010: The Best of 2009
February 2010: Ian Dury
March 2010: Bob Dylan
April 2010: David Bowie, Cherie Currie, Nick Kent
May 2010: John Peel
June 2010: Keith Richards, Lady Gaga
July 2010: Bruce Springsteen, Lily Allen
August 2010: The biggest acts in the world
September 2010: Richard Thompson
October 2010: Bryan Ferry
November 2010: Frank Zappa
December 2010: Bruce Springsteen
January 2011: The Best of 2010
February 2011: Tom Waits
March 2011: Elton John
April 2011: Joe Strummer, Bootsy Collins, Woody Guthrie
May 2011: Elvis Presley, Priscilla Presley
June 2011: Keith Richards, Ricky Gervais, The National, The Pierces, Hugh Laurie
July 2011: Dave Davies
August 2011: Brett Anderson
September 2011: Amy Winehouse
October 2011: George Harrison, Adele, Freddie Mercury
November 2011: Noel Gallagher
December 2011: Kate Bush
January 2012: The Best of 2011
February 2012: Leonard Cohen, P. J. Harvey 
March 2012: Lady Gaga
April 2012: Paul Weller
May 2012 Damon Albarn
June 2012 The Stone Roses
July 2012 Ray Davies
August 2012 Robert Smith

References

External links
Official website at the Wayback Machine
Reader community

2003 establishments in the United Kingdom
2012 disestablishments in the United Kingdom
Monthly magazines published in the United Kingdom
Music magazines published in the United Kingdom
Defunct magazines published in the United Kingdom
Magazines published in London
Magazines established in 2003
Magazines disestablished in 2012